A combat sport, or fighting sport, is a competitive contact sport that usually involves one-on-one combat. In many combat sports, a contestant wins by scoring more points than the opponent, submitting the opponent with a hold, disabling the opponent (knockout, KO), or attacking the opponent in a specific or designated technique. Combat sports share a long pedigree with the martial arts. 

Some combat sports (and their national origin) include Western Boxing (British), Brazilian jiu-jitsu (Japanese-Brazilian), Catch wrestling (British-American), Jiu-jitsu (Japanese), Judo (Japanese), Freestyle wrestling (British-American), Greco-Roman wrestling (French), Karate (Chinese-Okinawan-Japanese), Kickboxing (numerous origins), Lethwei (Burmese), Mixed martial arts (numerous origins), Muay Thai (Thai), Sambo (Soviet/Russian), Sanda (Chinese), Savate (French), Tae Kwon Do (Korean), Vale tudo (Brazilian), Pankration (Ancient Greek), Luta Livre (Brazilian), pro wrestling (American) and folk wrestling (various).

History 

Traditional styles of wrestling exist in most cultures; wrestling can be considered a cultural universal. Boxing contests date back to ancient Sumer in the 3rd millennium BCE and ancient Egypt circa 1350 BCE. The ancient Olympic Games included several combat-related sports: armored foot races, boxing, wrestling, and pankration, which was introduced in the Olympic Games of 648 BCE.

In ancient China, combat sport appeared in the form of lei tai. It was a no-holds barred combat sport that combined boxing and wrestling. There is evidence of similar combat sports in ancient Egypt, India and Japan.

Through the Middle ages and Renaissance, the tournament was popular. Tournaments were competitions that featured several mock combat events, with jousting as a main event. While the tournament was popular among aristocrats, combat sports were practiced by all levels of society. The German school of late medieval martial arts distinguished sportive combat (schimpf) from serious combat (ernst). In the German Renaissance, sportive combat competitions were known as Fechtschulen, corresponding to the Prize Playing in Tudor England. Out of these Prize Playing events developed the English boxing (or prizefighting) of the 18th century, which evolved into modern boxing with the introduction of the Marquess of Queensberry rules in 1867.

Amateur boxing has been part of the modern Olympic Games since their introduction in 1904. Professional boxing became popular in the United States in the 1920s and experienced a "golden age" after World War II.

The creation of Brazilian Jiu-Jitsu is attributed to the Gracie family of Brazil in 1925 after Asian martial arts were introduced to Brazil. Vale-tudo, wrestling, muay thai kickboxing and luta livre gained popularity.
Modern Muay Thai was developed in the 1920s to 1930s. Sambo was introduced in the Soviet Union. Modern Taekwondo also emerged after the Japanese occupation of Korea and became an Olympic sport in 2000. Sanshou as part of modern wushu was developed in the People's Republic of China since the 1950s. Kickboxing and full contact karate were developed in the 1960s and became popular in Japan and the West during the 1980s and 1990s. Modern MMA developed out of the interconnected subcultures of Vale Tudo and shoot wrestling. It was introduced in Japan in the form of Shooto in 1985, and in the United States as Ultimate Fighting Championship (UFC) in 1993. The Unified Rules of Mixed Martial Arts were introduced in 2000, and the sport experienced peak popularity in the 2000s. During this period, multiple brands and promotions were established. The most well-known promotion for MMA is UFC.

Popularity by gender 

Combat sports are generally more popular among men as athletes and spectators. For many years, participation in combat sports was practically exclusive to men; USA Boxing had a ban on women's boxing until 1993. A study conducted by Greenwell, Hancock, Simmons, and Thorn in 2015 revealed that combat sports had a largely male audience.

List

Unarmed

Striking

Karate
Yoshukai
 Kyokushin
 Shotokan
 Chito-ryu
 Genseiryu
 Goju-ryu
 Gosoku-ryu
 Isshin-ryu
 Motobu-ryu
 Seidokaikan
 Shindo Jinen-ryu
 Shito-ryu
 Shorin-ryu
 Shukokai
 Shuri-ryu
 Uechi-ryu
Wado-ryu
 Matsubayashi-ryu
 Shudokan
 Ryūei-ryū
 Shōrei-ryū
 Tōon-ryū
Bōgutsuki
Wushu
Northern Praying Mantis Kung Fu
Southern Dragon Kung Fu
Monkey Kung Fu
Jow-Ga Kung Fu
Leopard Kung Fu
Snake Kung Fu
Bajiquan
Zi Ran Men
Bak Mei
Emeiquan
Mizongyi
Mian Quan
Chuōjiǎo
Heihuquan
Fu Jow Pai
Hung Fut
Duan Quan
Choy Gar
Li
Yiquan
Fut Gar
Chow Gar
Boxing and Kickboxing
Amateur boxing
Bare-knuckle boxing
Professional boxing
Greek Boxing
English Boxing
Russian Boxing
Chivarreto boxing
Cuban Boxing
Filipino Boxing
Japanese Kickboxing
American Kickboxing
Dutch Kickboxing
Muay Boran
Muay thai
Muay Lao
Lethwei
Savate
Pradal Serey
Taekwondo
ITF Taekwondo
STF Taekwondo
ATA Taekwondo
Rhee Taekwondo
Kukkiwon Taekwondo
Extreme Taekwondo
Kun Gek Do
Suntukan
Sikaran
Tang Soo Do
Taidō
Adimurai
Capoeira
Nippon Kempo
Luta Livre combate

Grappling

Wrestling
Freestyle wrestling
Greco-Roman wrestling
Collegiate wrestling
Scholastic wrestling
Catch wrestling
Submission wrestling
Submission Arts Wrestling
Combat Submission Wrestling
Greek wrestling
Shoot wrestling
Folk wrestling
Cornish wrestling
Cumberland Wrestling
Westmorland wrestling
Lancashire wrestling
Devon wrestling
Hayastan Freestyle Wrestling
Iranian wrestling
Khmer traditional wrestling
Canarian wrestling
Leonese wrestling
Senegalese wrestling
Kazakh wrestling
Backhold wrestling
Lutte Traditionnelle
Jobbarer Boli Khela
Narodno rvanje
Gatta Gusthi
Karakucak
Schwingen
Shuai Jiao
Pehlwani
Ristynės
Ssireum
Ringen
Pelivan
Bokh
Gouren
Barróg
Glima
Naban
Dumog
Alysh
Khridoli
Chidaoba
Kurash
Khuresh
Tegumi
Kene
Malakhra
Inbuan
Mukna
Vajra-mushti
Huka-huka
Coreeda
 Jujutsu
Hakko-ryu
Kitō-ryū
Sekiguchi-ryu
Shindō Yōshin-ryū
Kukishin-ryū
Judo
Kodokan Judo
Kosen Judo
Brazilian jiu-jitsu
10th Planet jiu-jitsu
 Luta Livre Esportiva
Sport Sambo
Sumo
Chin Na

Hybrid

Mixed martial arts
Jujutsu
 German Ju-Jitsu
 Atemi Ju-Jitsu
Danzan-ryu Ju-Jitsu
 Hokutoryu Ju-Jutsu
 Small Circle JuJitsu
 Budoshin Ju-Jitsu
 Dait%C5%8D-ry%C5%AB Aiki-j%C5%ABjutsu
 Gyokushin-ryū Ju-Jitsu
 Kyushin-ryu Ju-Jitsu
 Shinden Futo-ryu Ju-Jitsu
Wushu
Southern Praying Mantis Kung Fu
Crane Kung Fu
Sanda Sanshou
Wing Chun
Choy Li Fut
Eagle Claw
Taekkyeon
Hybrid Taekwondo
Han Moo Do
Han Mu Do
Teukgong Moosoool
Yongmudo
Pankration 
Ano Pankration
Kato Pankration
Shootfighting
Gaidojutsu
Kajukenbo
Vale tudo
Luta Livre
Combat sambo
Kudo
Taijutsu
Atemi Judo
ARB
Yaw-Yan Kickboxing
Ancient Bare-Knuckle Boxing
Muay Chaiya
Musti-yuddha 
Malla-yuddha
Combat Hopak
Shootboxing
Real Aikido
Aikido
Hapkido
Angampora
Unifight
American Kenpo
Shorinji Kempo

Armed

Bladed weapons
Academic fencing
Fechtschule
Fencing
Historical European martial arts
Historical medieval battles
Kendo
Stick-fighting
 Bâton français
 Quarterstaff
 Singlestick
Hastilude
Arnis
Competitive jousting
Shooting sports
Airsoft
Paintball

Techniques
The techniques used can be categorized into three domains: striking, grappling, and weapon usage, with some hybrid rule-sets combining striking and grappling. In combat sports the use of these various techniques are highly regulated to minimize permanent or severe physical damage to each participant though means of organized officiating by a single or multiple referees that can distribute penalties or interrupt the actions of the competitors during the competition. In weapon based sports, the weapons used are made to be non-lethal by means of modifying the striking portions of the weapon and requiring participants to wear protective clothing/armor.

Olympics 

 Amateur boxing (1904-2020): Boxing has been staged at every summer Olympic games since 1904 except Stockholm in 1912 due to Swedish law.
 Judo (1964, 1972-2020): Judo was not included in the 1968 Mexico City summer Olympics. Women's judo was added to the Olympics in 1992 in Barcelona.
 Taekwondo (1988 Seoul Games as demonstration sport, 2000-2020): Became an official medal sport at the 2000 Sydney Olympic Games.
 Wrestling Greco-Roman (1908-2020): The first form of wrestling to be held at the Olympic Games.
 Wrestling Freestyle (1920-2020): Was modified at the 2000 Sydney Games and reduced the amount of weight categories provided.
 Pankration and singlestick are two other forms of combat sports that have been included in the Olympics. These combat sports were introduced to the Olympic Games in the early 1900s however singlestick was only represented at the 1904 Olympic games and pankration whilst lasting four centuries in Ancient Greek Olympia's, was not included at all after 1900.
 Fencing (1896-2020): Competitive fencing is one of the five activities which have been featured in every modern Olympic Games, the other four being athletics, cycling, swimming, and gymnastics.
 Olympic dueling (1906-1908): Demonstration sport at the 1906 Olympics and 1908 Olympics.
 Karate (2020): Karate made its Olympic debut for Tokyo 2020 under new IOC rules.

Protective gear and clothing 
In combat sports, victory is obtained from blows, punches or attacks to the head to a point of physical injury that the opponent is unable to continue. Different forms of combat sport have different rules and regulations into the equipment competitors have to wear. In Amateur boxing seen at the Olympics, competitors are permitted to wear head guards and correctly weighted padded gloves, mouth guards are optional and the canvas floor protection from a hard fall. In sports such as Taekwondo, competitors are permitted to wear a trunk protector, head guard, gloves, groin guard and shin and forearm pads. Professional boxing and MMA are two of the most dangerous combat sports in the world due to the lack of protective gear worn (compared to the protected fists). Competitors in these two sports have the option to wear a mouthguard and must wear suitable gloves. The lack of protective clothing makes competitors vulnerable to concussion and further traumatic head injuries. A scientific experiment, conducted last year by Dr Andrew McIntosh of ACRISP at the Federation University of Australia, tested the impact of 7 different head guards in combat sport. The results of the experiment revealed the benefits of the combination of a glove and headguard in maximising the impact energy attenuation. A study conducted by Lystad showed that combat sports with little to no protective gear such as MMA or boxing has an injury incidence rate range of 85.1-280.7 per 1000 athletes in comparison to another striking combat sport like Taekwondo which has a large amount of protective gear such as pads, headgear, mouth guard and gloves, has an injury incidence rate range of 19.1-138.8 per 1000 athletes. This means that injury rates are drastically lowered when protective gear is used.

Gear includes:
 Gloves
 Headgear
 Mouthguard
 Shin guards
 Arm guards
 Groin guard
 Trunk guard
 Wraps (material wrapped around the hand and wrist (and/or foot and ankle) that provides added alignment, support and protection)

Fighting area 
 Mat
circular layout or rectangular layout
 Ring
with ropes around the fighting area
boxing ring
without ropes around the fighting area
pit: A circle 27 feet in diameter, of which the inner 24 feet is colored blue. The next 3 feet is yellow, which is the caution area. When the fighter gets to the yellow area, he know they are getting close to stepping out-of-bounds. The last edge of the ring is the red zone, which features a 30-degree upward angle. When a fighter steps on the red area, they are stepping up slightly, letting them know they are out-of-bounds.
sumo ring (dohyō), sand ring
 Fenced area (generically referred to as "cage")
 Can be round or have at least six sides. The fenced area is generally called a cage or more precisely, depending on the shape, a hexagon (if it has 6 sides) / an octagon (if it has 8 sides).
 Some replace the metal fencing with a net.

See also
 Blood sport
 Hand-to-hand combat
 Hoplology
 Mixed martial arts

References

 
Sports by type
Individual sports
Combat